The greater scythebill (Drymotoxeres pucheranii) is a species of suboscine passerine bird in the Dendrocolaptinae subfamily. This species is found at very low densities in highland rainforests and cloud forests in the Tropical Andes in Colombia, Ecuador, and Peru. It has traditionally been included in the genus Campylorhamphus together with the other scythebills, but the discovery of its closer affinities with the scimitar-billed woodcreeper resulted in the description of the new genus Drymotoxeres for the greater scythebill.

The greater scythebill is genetically most closely related to the scimitar-billed woodcreeper (Drymornis bridgesii). The species is monotypic: no subspecies are recognised.

References

greater scythebill
Birds of the Colombian Andes
Birds of the Ecuadorian Andes
greater scythebill
Taxonomy articles created by Polbot